The Dong River is the eastern tributary of the Pearl River in Guangdong province, southern China. The other two main tributaries of Pearl River are Xi River and Bei River. The headwater is located in Mount Sanbai in Anyuan County, Jiangxi.

The Dong River is a major source of water for megacities in Pearl River Delta, including Hong Kong, Shenzhen, and Guangzhou. The Hong Kong Government has purchased Dong River water from Guangdong since 1965. Over 70 percent of domestic water in Hong Kong is imported from the Dong River.

Historical findings 
A dinosaur egg fossil dated back to the Late Cretaceous was discovered by primary school student named Zhang Yangzhe while playing near the Dong River in 2019 in July. The boy's mother, Li Xiaofang, later contacted the Heyuan Dinosaur Museum members, and under their excavation guidance more than 10 dinosaur egg fossils each about 9 centimeters in diameter and dating back to 66 million years were revealed.

Places along the river include

 Ganzhou, Jiangxi
 Anyuan
 Xunwu
 Heyuan, Guangdong
 Longchuan 
 Dongyuan 
 Yuancheng District
 Huizhou
 Boluo
 Huicheng District
 Dongguan

See also
 Pearl River Delta
 Geography of China
 List of rivers in China

References

Rivers of Guangdong
Economy of Hong Kong
Tributaries of the Pearl River (China)